Karen Lynne Hall (born June 2, 1956) is an American television writer, producer, author, bookstore owner and a member of
the George Foster Peabody Awards board of jurors, best known for her work on the television series Judging Amy and M*A*S*H.

Early life 
Hall was born in Chatham, Virginia to Ervis Hall and Flo Hall. Hall's younger sister, Barbara Hall, is also a television writer and producer. In 1974, Hall graduated from Chatham High School.

Education 
In 1978, Hall graduated with a B.A. degree in English from College of William and Mary. Then she was awarded a fellowship from the Virginia Museum of Fine Arts to the University of Virginia, where she was in graduate school in the M.F.A. Playwriting Program.

While at William and Mary, Hall took a three-week trip to Hollywood with students from the University of Richmond. There she attended writing seminars hosted by Earl Hamner and Alan Alda. Impressed by her talent, both Hamner and Alda kept in touch with her after she returned to Virginia. With their encouragement, she decided to move to California after graduating from the University of Virginia in 1979.

Career 
Hall started her television writing career as a story editor of Eight Is Enough and writing scripts for M*A*S*H. In her career as writer, producer and creative consultant, Hall has worked on numerous series including Hill Street Blues, Moonlighting, Roseanne and Grace Under Fire. Shows for which she wrote individual episodes include Northern Exposure, I'll Fly Away, Judging Amy and The Good Wife.

Among other recognitions, Hall has received the Humanitas Prize, the Women in Film Luminas Award and the Writers Guild of America Award. She has received seven Emmy Award Nominations. In 1984, she was listed by Esquire Magazine in its first annual register, "The Best of the New Generation: Men and Women under 40 Who Are Changing America".

Hall is also the author of the novel Dark Debts, a supernatural thriller combining horror, Southern Gothic, humor, romance and theological mystery. Dark Debts was published by Random House in 1996 and was a Book of the Month Club main selection. It has been translated into French, German and Japanese. The novel was re-published by Simon & Schuster in 2016, after Hall made significant changes to it. In 2021 she was hired by Ignatius Press to write a memoir about her friendship with Jesuit Biblical Scholar Fr. Paul V. Mankowski, SJ. The book is called "The Sound of Silence." Release date TBD.

Hall has spent the last decade as an adjunct college professor. She has taught undergraduates at Appalachian State University and MFA screenwriting students at The University of Georgia and at Regent University, where she teaches at present."

Personal life 
Hall is married to her high school sweetheart, Chris Walker. They live in Orlando, Florida. They have four adult children.

Select filmography 

 Eight Is Enough (1977)
 Hill Street Blues (1981)
 M*A*S*H (1980–1983)
 Moonlighting (1985)
 The Women of Brewster Place (1989)
 Northern Exposure (1990)
 Judging Amy (1999)
 Brotherhood (2008)
 The Good Wife (2010)
 The Glades (2011)

Publications 

 Dark Debts. New York: Random House, 1996: . Ivy Books, 1997: . Pan Books (UK), 1998: , Simon & Schuster, 2016 ISBN 978-1501104114

References

External links 

 
 Hall's personal blog

1956 births
Living people
People from Chatham, Virginia
American women television producers
American television writers
College of William & Mary alumni
American women television writers
Screenwriters from Virginia
20th-century American novelists
American women novelists
Television producers from Virginia